The 2019–20 Côte d'Ivoire Ligue 1 is the 61st season of the Côte d'Ivoire Ligue 1, the top-tier league of the Ivorian football league system since its establishment in 1960.The season started on 17 August 2019 but was suspended on 8 March 2020 due to the effects of the COVID-19 pandemic.

On 26 June 2020 however, the FIF announced that the season has been cancelled due to the coronavirus pandemic. Racing Club Abidjan were crowned champions and will represent the country at the 2020–21 CAF Champions League while there would be no relegation with the two teams promoting from the Ligue 2 expanding the league to 16 starting from the next season.

They further stated that the 2020 Coupe de Côte d'Ivoire has been cancelled, with second-place finishers, FC San Pédro representing the country at the 2020–21 CAF Confederation Cup.

SO de l'Armée were the defending champions, winning the championship in the 2018-2019 season.

Teams
Fourteen teams contested the league, twelve teams from the previous season and two promoted teams from the 2018–19 Ligue Two; SOL FC and Issia Wazi who replaced Limane Yacouba Sylla FC Sassandra and Moossou FC as they were relegated from the previous season.

There would be no relegation this season.

Note: Table lists in alphabetical order.

Locations of teams

League table

Results

See also
 2019–20 Nigeria Professional Football League
 2019–20 Elite One
 2019–20 Ghana Premier League

References

External links
RSSF.com
Ivorian Football Federation

Ligue 1 (Ivory Coast) seasons
Ivory Coast
1
Ivory Coast